The New Zealand cricket team toured Zimbabwe in July and August 2016 to play two Test matches. Both Test matches took place at Queens Sports Club, Bulawayo. They were the first Tests for Zimbabwe since they toured Bangladesh at the end of 2014. New Zealand won the two-match series 2–0.

New Zealand Cricket (NZC) monitored unrest that was happening in Zimbabwe before the tour started, including nationwide strikes and protests. There were no plans to delay the team's departure for the series and the New Zealand squad arrived in the country on July 20 as scheduled. Zimbabwe fans were asked to join a peaceful protest during the second Test of the series in support of the #thisflag movement.

Squads

Tendai Chatara was ruled out of Zimbabwe's squad with an ankle injury which he got in the warm-up match. Michael Chinouya was named as his replacement.

Tour match

Three-day: Zimbabwe A v New Zealanders

Test series

1st Test

2nd Test

References

External links
 Series home at ESPN Cricinfo

2016 in New Zealand cricket
2016 in Zimbabwean cricket
International cricket competitions in 2016
New Zealand cricket tours of Zimbabwe